My Name is a South Korean streaming television series directed by Kim Jin-min and starring Han So-hee, Park Hee-soon, and Ahn Bo-hyun. The series revolves around a woman who joins a gang to avenge her father's death and then becomes the gang's mole inside the police force. Three episodes out of eight were screened at 26th Busan International Film Festival in newly created 'On Screen' section, on October 7, 2021. It was released on Netflix on October 15, 2021.

Synopsis
Following her father's murder, a revenge-driven woman (Han So-hee) puts her trust in a powerful crime boss — and enters the police force under his direction.

Cast

Main
 Han So-hee as Yoon Ji-woo / Oh Hye-jin
 A member of Dongcheon who infiltrates the police force as Oh Hye-jin, seeking revenge for her father's murder.
 Park Hee-soon as Choi Mu-jin
 The boss of Dongcheon, which is Korea's biggest drug ring. He trusts Ji-woo simply because of the power of her desperation. He was best friends with Ji-woo's father.
 Ahn Bo-hyun as Jeon Pil-do
 A detective of Inchang Metropolitan Police Agency's Narcotics unit who becomes Hye-jin's partner after she joins the unit. He initially disliked Jiwoo because she ruined a sting operation he had been planning for 6 months.

Supporting
 Kim Sang-ho as Cha Gi-ho
 The leader of Inchang Metropolitan Police Agency's Narcotics unit who swore to take down Dongcheon before he retires.
 Lee Hak-joo as Jung Tae-ju
 A member of Dongcheon, he is Mu-jin's most trusted henchman.
  as Do Gang-jae
 A former member of Dongcheon, he swears revenge against the organization after getting expelled for trying to rape Jiwoo when he lost to her in a match.
 Yoon Kyung-ho as Yoon Dong-hoon
 Ji-woo's father and Mu-jin's close friend whose murder sets off Ji-woo's revenge journey.
 Baek Joo-hee as Kang Soo-yeon
 Moon Sang-min as Ko Gun-pyung

Episodes

Production
On August 11, 2020 Netflix confirmed through a press release that it would distribute another Korean original series Undercover, to be produced by Studio Santa Claus Entertainment Co., Ltd. (named as Fleet Co., Ltd. at the time, and the same production house behind Lucky Romance, My Sassy Girl and Another Child), written by Life Risking Romance TV series writer Kim Ba-da and directed by Extracurricular TV series director Kim Jin-min. In September 2020, the cast of TV series was confirmed. Filming began in November 2020 and ended in February 2021.

Actors Han So-hee and Lee Hak-joo previously worked together in the 2020 JTBC drama series The World of the Married. The series also marks the second time that actors Ahn Bo-hyun and Yoon Kyung-ho acted together after the series Itaewon Class, which also aired on JTBC in 2020.

Reception

Original soundtrack

Track listings

Accolades

Awards and nominations

Listicle

References

External links
 
 
 
 My Name at Daum 

Korean-language Netflix original programming
2021 South Korean television series debuts
Television series by Studio Santa Claus Entertainment
South Korean action television series
South Korean crime television series
South Korean thriller television series
South Korean web series
Television series about revenge